Gods Hand is the sixth studio album by American hip hop duo Axe Murder Boyz. It was released on September 16, 2006 under their own label Canonize Productions in conjunction with Hatchet House. It is also the first of two releases that AMB would release on Hatchet House before they left the label in 2011. The album peaked at #11 on the Billboard Top Heatseekers chart and #36 on the Top Independent Albums chart.

Track listing 
Tears Of Blood – 1:09
Gods Hand Killers – 3:02
Overcome – 3:59
Regardless (featuring F.L.O.W.S on the chorus) – 5:31
Redrum Where I'm From – 3:03
Grindin/??? – 3:46
Scrub Life – 3:05
F.R.E.S.H. – 10:00
Underground Sorcerer – 3:34
Apocalypse – 3:44
Rose Garden – 3:42
Canonize – 2:47
Skeet – 2:24
Peace – 3:58
Karmakazi (featuring Pray) – 4:45
My Brothers Keeper (featuring Big B and The Dirtball) – 3:34
Heart Attack – 3:02
I Stay Wicked – 3:30
Lord Help Me – 4:40

References

2008 albums
Axe Murder Boyz albums
Hatchet House albums
Gangsta rap albums by American artists